Walker Keith Armistead (March 25, 1783 – October 13, 1845) was a military officer who served as Chief of Engineers of the United States Army Corps of Engineers.

Armistead was born in Upperville, Fauquier County, Virginia, and served as an orderly sergeant at the Battle of Fallen Timbers. He graduated from West Point in 1803. During the War of 1812, he was promoted to lieutenant colonel and successively served as Chief Engineer of the Niagara frontier army and the forces defending Chesapeake Bay. He was promoted to colonel and Chief Engineer on November 12, 1818. When the Army was reorganized on June 1, 1821, he became commander of the 3rd Artillery Regiment. He was brevetted brigadier general in November 1828.  He succeeded Zachary Taylor as commander of the army during the Second Seminole War against the Seminole Indians in Florida in 1840–1841.

After 42 years of service as a commissioned officer, Armistead died in New Market, Virginia at the age of 72, and is buried in the Armistead family cemetery in Upperville.

Family
His brother George Armistead commanded Fort McHenry during the Battle of Baltimore in the War of 1812. The attack became immortalized by onlooker Francis Scott Key who penned "The Star-Spangled Banner" while watching the British bombardment of Armistead's fort.

His son Lewis Addison Armistead was a Confederate general who died during Pickett's Charge at the Battle of Gettysburg in 1863.

References
This article contains public domain text from 

Service Profile

United States Military Academy alumni
United States Army personnel of the War of 1812
1773 births
1845 deaths
American people of the Seminole Wars
People from Fauquier County, Virginia
Virginia colonial people
United States Army colonels